Santo Domingo Suchitepéquez is a town and municipality in the Suchitepéquez Department of Guatemala.

References

Municipalities of the Suchitepéquez Department